Intan Nurtjahja born 1947,  is a former Indonesian badminton player in the 70s.

Profile
Intan Nurtjahja is a former Indonesian badminton player in the women's doubles and mixed doubles at the    1971 Asian Badminton Championships, winning the women's doubles gold medal with Retno Koestijah and a silver medal in mixed doubles with Indra Gunawan. In 1972 Uber Cup she participated  women's world championships and was awarded a silver medal.

Achievements

Asian Championships 

Women's doubles 

Mixed doubles

International Open Tournaments (3 titles) 

Women's singles

Women's doubles

References 

1947 births
Living people
Indonesian female badminton players